Drew Bagnall (born October 26, 1983) is a Canadian former professional ice hockey defenceman who played briefly with the Minnesota Wild in the National Hockey League (NHL).

Playing career
Bagnall played four seasons for St. Lawrence University and five years in the minor leagues.  In April 2011, at the age of 27, Bagnall made his NHL debut playing for the Minnesota Wild against the Edmonton Oilers. He primarily played as Captain with the Wild's AHL affiliate, the Houston Aeros.

On July 6, 2013, Bagnall left the Wild organization and signed a two-year, two way contract as a free agent with the Buffalo Sabres. Bagnall spent the entirety of his time in the Sabres organization with the Rochester Americans, serving as team Captain.

As a free agent, Bagnall announced his retirement from professional hockey on August 31, 2015.

Career statistics

Awards and honors

References

External links

1983 births
Canadian ice hockey defencemen
Dallas Stars draft picks
Houston Aeros (1994–2013) players
Ice hockey people from Manitoba
Living people
Manchester Monarchs (AHL) players
Minnesota Wild players
People from Oakbank, Manitoba
Reading Royals players
Rochester Americans players
St. Lawrence Saints men's ice hockey players
AHCA Division I men's ice hockey All-Americans